Hal Schaefer (22 July 1925 – 8 December 2012) was an American jazz musician and vocal coach. He coached Marilyn Monroe, Mitzi Gaynor, Judy Garland, Robert Wagner, Jane Russell and Barbra Streisand in films and musical comedy songs, and composed the film scores to The Money Trap (1965) and The Amsterdam Kill (1977). Schaefer was a pianist in Benny Carter's group including performing as a pianist in Harry James and Boyd Raeburn's jazz groups and for Peggy Lee and Billy Eckstine. During his career he helped many directors and producers such as Howard Hawks, Harold Prince and George Cukor.

Schaefer was nominated by Michael Feinstein in 2009 for the Best Latin Jazz Award and also for the NEA Jazz Masters. He never left the music industry. Schaefer once performed a musical piece for Eleanor Roosevelt and sang at the United Nations's anniversary in 1955. He moved to Florida in the 1990s and continued to teach voice lessons to students until his death.

bwell

Discography

Albums

References

External links

1925 births
2012 deaths
American jazz musicians
Discovery Records artists
United Artists Records artists
RCA Victor artists